Asuragina is a genus of flies in the family Athericidae.

Species
Asuragina yangi Yang & Nagatomi, 1992

References

Athericidae
Brachycera genera
Diptera of Asia